Rhonda Thorne (born 6 February 1958, in Toowoomba, Queensland) (also known as Rhonda Clayton and Rhonda Shapland) is a former World No. 1 squash player from Australia. She was one of the leading players on the international squash circuit in the late-1970s and early-1980s, and won the 1981 Women's World Open Squash Championship.

Born Rhonda Shapland she married Ross Thorne, a notable squash player in 1978 and changed her name to Rhonda Thorne.

In the 1981 World Open final in Toronto, Canada, Thorne beat fellow Australian player Vicki Cardwell 8-10, 9-4, 9-5, 7-9, 9-7 to become world champion. Thorne and Cardwell reached the World Open final again in 1983 when it was held in Perth, with Cardwell winning this time 9-1, 9-3, 9-4.

Thorne was at the pinnacle of her game in the early-1980s, and held the World No.1 ranking in both 1981 and 1982. She remained in the world’s top-10 from 1979-84.

Thorne represented Australia in international team squash for seven years from 1977-84. She captained the Australian team from 1981–83, during which time the team won to two World Team Squash Championship titles.

As a junior player, Thorne won four Australian Junior Opens in 1972, 1974, 1975, and 1976.

Thorne retired from the international squash circuit in 1985. That year she won the Queensland Sportswoman of the Year award. Since retiring, she has been inducted into the Squash Australia Hall of Fame and was an inaugural member of the Queensland Squash Hall of Fame. She was also awarded the Australian Sports Medal in 2000 recognition for her achievements.

References

External links
 

Australian female squash players
1958 births
Living people